Dominic Andres (born 6 October 1972) is a Swiss curler and Olympic champion. He received a gold medal at the 1998 Winter Olympics in Nagano.

He was skip for the Swiss team that received a bronze medal at the 1991 World Junior Curling Championships (shared with the United States team). He received bronze medals at the 1994 and the 1999 World Curling Championships.

References

External links
 

1972 births
Living people
Swiss male curlers
Olympic curlers of Switzerland
Curlers at the 1998 Winter Olympics
Olympic gold medalists for Switzerland
Olympic medalists in curling
Medalists at the 1998 Winter Olympics
Swiss curling champions
20th-century Swiss people